Alexander Goldin (born February 27, 1964) is an American chess grandmaster of Russian origin.

Goldin had success from a young age. In 1981 he won the USSR Under-18 Championship. He was a joint winner of the Soviet Championship semifinal at Sevastopol in 1986 (a qualifier for the 1987 First League Final). Other tournament successes include winning the Philadelphia's World Open in 1998 and 2001. In 2003 Goldin won the American Continental Chess Championship in Buenos Aires edging out on tiebreak score Giovanni Vescovi, after both players scored 8.5/11.

In team chess, he played board three for the US team at the 2004 Chess Olympiad in Calvià and registered a 65% score.

References

External links
 
 
 
 
 

1965 births
Living people
Russian chess players
Soviet chess players
American chess players
Chess grandmasters
Chess Olympiad competitors
American people of Russian descent
Place of birth missing (living people)